Bop Till You Drop is Ry Cooder's eighth album, released in 1979.  The album was the first digitally recorded major-label album in popular music. Bop Till You Drop was recorded on a digital 32-track machine built by 3M.

The album consists almost entirely of covers of earlier rhythm and blues and rock and roll classics, including Elvis Presley's "Little Sister" and the 1965 Fontella Bass-Bobby McClure hit "Don't Mess Up a Good Thing", on which Cooder duetted with soul star Chaka Khan. Khan also performed on the only original track on the album, "Down in Hollywood".

Reception 
Reviewing the album for AllMusic, Brett Hartenbach said:
Cooder and his excellent band, which includes the rhythm section of Tim Drummond and Jim Keltner along with guitarist David Lindley, understand the material and are more than capable of laying down a decent groove, but something must have gotten lost in translation from what was played to what came across on the recording. There's a thinness to the tracks that undermines the performances, which according to Cooder is due to the digital recording.

Track listing

Personnel

Musicians 

 Jimmy Adams – backing vocals (3, 7)
 Ronnie Barron – organ (5), guitar (8) 
 Ry Cooder – guitars, mandolin, lead vocals, backing vocals, producer
 Tim Drummond – bass guitar
 Cliff Givens – backing vocals (3)
 Rev. Patrick Henderson – organ (2)
 Milt Holland – percussion, drums
 Bill Johnson – backing vocals (3) 
 Herman Johnson – backing vocals (1, 9)
 Jim Keltner – drums
 Chaka Khan – vocals (5, 8) 
 Bobby King – vocals (5, 9), backing vocals (1, 2, 3, 7)
 David Lindley – guitar, mandolin
 Randy Lorenzo – backing vocals (2)
 George "Biggie" McFadden – backing vocals (7)
 Simon Pico Payne – backing vocals (3) 
 Greg Prestopino – backing vocals (3)

Technical 

 Loyd Clifft – assistant engineer
 David Alexander – photography
 Vicki Fortson – production coordination
 Lee Herschberg – engineer
 David Kraai – technical support
 Penny Ringwood – production coordination
 Mike Salisbury – design

Charts

Weekly charts

Year-end charts

Certifications

References 

1979 albums
Ry Cooder albums
Covers albums
Warner Records albums
Albums produced by Ry Cooder